L'Opium et le Bâton is a 1971 Algerian drama film directed by Ahmed Rachedi. It was entered into the 7th Moscow International Film Festival.

Cast
 Marie-José Nat as Farroudja
 Sid Ali Kouiret as Ali
 Jean-Louis Trintignant as Chaudier
 Jean-Claude Bercq as Delécluze
 Mustapha Kateb as Lazrak
 Rouïched as Tayeb

References

External links
 

1971 films
1971 drama films
Algerian drama films
1970s Arabic-language films
1970s French-language films
1971 multilingual films
Algerian multilingual films